The Bill Evans Album is an album by the jazz pianist Bill Evans, released in 1971. It is his first album to feature all compositions written (or co-written), arranged and performed by Evans.

At the Grammy Awards of 1972, The Bill Evans Album won the Grammy Award for Best Jazz Instrumental Solo and the Best Jazz Performance by a Group awards.

The Bill Evans Memorial Library states it is the first recording in which Evans used a Fender Rhodes piano.

The title of the song "Re: Person I Knew" (recorded first on an earlier record in 1962, Moon Beams) is an anagram of the name of Evans' longtime producer, Orrin Keepnews.

The cover image is based on a photograph taken by music photographer Don Hunstein.

The Bill Evans Album was reissued with three bonus alternative tracks by Sony in 2005.

Track listing
All songs by Bill Evans except where noted.
 "Funkallero" (Album Version) – 7:45
 "Two Lonely People" (Bill Evans, Carol Hall) – 6:10
 "Sugar Plum" (Album Version) – 7:02
 "Waltz For Debby" (Evans, Gene Lees) – 7:41
 "T.T.T. (Twelve Tone Tune)" – 6:38
 "Re: Person I Knew" – 5:52
 "Comrade Conrad" (Album Version) – 7:34
 2005 reissue bonus tracks:
 "Waltz for Debby" [alternate take] (Evans, Gene Lees) – 7:47
 "Re: Person I Knew" [alternate take] – 7:16
 "Funkallero" [alternate take] – 6:09

Personnel
 Bill Evans – piano, Fender Rhodes
 Eddie Gómez – bass
 Marty Morell – drums

Production
 Helen Keane – producer
 Peter Weiss – engineer, mixing
 Orrin Keepnews – reissue producer
 Mark Wilder – remastering
 John Berg – art direction
 Fred Binkley – liner notes
 Don Hunstein – photography
 Seth Rothstein – project director
 Paula Wood – art direction, design

Charts

References

Bill Evans albums
1971 albums
Columbia Records albums
Albums recorded at CBS 30th Street Studio
Grammy Award for Best Jazz Instrumental Album